Lee Seung-won (born 15 April 1979) is a South Korean fencer. He competed in the individual sabre event at the 2000 Summer Olympics.

References

External links
 

1979 births
Living people
South Korean male sabre fencers
Olympic fencers of South Korea
Fencers at the 2000 Summer Olympics
Asian Games medalists in fencing
Fencers at the 2002 Asian Games
Asian Games gold medalists for South Korea
Medalists at the 2002 Asian Games